Route 91, also known as Old Placentia Highway, is a  east–west highway located on the Avalon Peninsula in the Canadian province of Newfoundland and Labrador.  The highway starts at a junction at Route 90, traveling through the town of Colinet on a paved road, then transitions to a dirt road just west of the Route 92 junction, only to transition back to a paved road prior to approaching its western terminus, Southeast Placentia, where it intersects with Route 100.  Along the stretch of dirt road is Cataracts Provincial Park, one of only a small number of active provincial parks remaining since 1997.

Major intersections

References

091